Reuna Richardson (born 12 February 1992) is a Bermudian woman cricketer. She played for Bermuda at the 2008 Women's Cricket World Cup Qualifier.

References

External links 

1992 births
Living people
Bermudian women cricketers